Qaleh-ye Qareh Dash (also Romanized as Qal‘eh-ye Qareh Dāsh) is a village in Qaqazan-e Sharqi Rural District, in the Central District of Takestan County, Qazvin Province, Iran. At the 2006 census, its population was 181, in 52 families.

References 

Populated places in Takestan County